Air Marshal Sir Maurice Lionel Heath,  (12 August 1909 – 9 July 1998) was a British senior Royal Air Force officer who became Commander of British Forces Arabian Peninsula.

RAF career
Educated at Sutton Valence School in Kent, Heath joined the Royal Air Force as a cadet in 1927. He served in the Second World War on the staff at the Deputy Directorate of Armament Training before becoming Station Commander at RAF Metheringham. He became Officer Commanding the Central Gunnery School in 1948, Officer Commanding the Bomber Command Bombing School in 1952 and Deputy Air Secretary in 1954. He was appointed Commander of British Forces Arabian Peninsula in 1957 before moving on to be Commandant at the RAF Staff College, Bracknell in 1959 and Chief of Staff at Headquarters Allied Air Forces Central Europe in 1962 before retiring in 1965.

In retirement he became a working director of a London firm of estate agents as well as Deputy Lieutenant of West Sussex.

Family
He married Kathleen Mary Gibson in 1938; they had one son and one daughter. Following the death of his first wife he married Lisa Cooke in 1989.

References

|-

1909 births
1998 deaths
Royal Air Force air marshals
Knights Commander of the Order of the British Empire
Companions of the Order of the Bath
Commanders of the Royal Victorian Order
People educated at Sutton Valence School